Durai Murugan  (born 1 July 1938) is an Indian  politician and lawyer. He is the Minister for Water Resources under the government of M. K. Stalin since 2021. He is the general secretary of the DMK party since 9 September 2020. He graduated in M.A. and B.L. and is an advocate by profession. He is a very close confidant to former DMK Supremo M. Karunanidhi and his son DMK President M. K. Stalin. He also worked as Treasurer, Principal Secretary and Deputy General secretary of the DMK party.

Durai Murugan was first elected to the Tamil Nadu legislative assembly in 1971 and has been elected ten times since. He was elected from the Katpadi constituency in 2006. After the 2006 assembly elections, Durai Murugan was appointed Minister for Public Works in the Government of Tamil Nadu. 

He was divested of the Public Works Department portfolio on 13 July 2009.

He was re-elected from the Katpadi constituency in the elections of 2016.

He currently resides in Kotturpuram, Chennai.

Elections contested and results

References 

1938 births
Living people
State cabinet ministers of Tamil Nadu
Dravida Munnetra Kazhagam politicians
Tamil Nadu MLAs 1996–2001
Tamil Nadu MLAs 2001–2006
Tamil Nadu MLAs 2006–2011
Tamil Nadu MLAs 2011–2016
Tamil Nadu MLAs 2016–2021
People from Vellore district
Tamil Nadu MLAs 2021–2026
Tamil Nadu politicians